Ubiquitin specific peptidase 8 pseudogene 1 is a protein that in humans is encoded by the USP8P1 gene.

References